Broadview TV GmbH is a German documentary film production company based in Cologne.

BROADVIEW produces documentaries for broadcast and cable networks in Germany and worldwide, including ZDF, ARD, arte, HBO, A&E, NHK, RTL, as well as for national and international Institutions including the German Foreign Office and the Commission of the European Union. The films have gone on to win the International Emmy® Award, the German Television Award, the Magnolia Award and Banff Television Award.

History 
Since its founding in 1999 by Leopold Hoesch, BROADVIEW TV is one of Germany's leading production companies in the fields of history, politics, culture, science and sports for TV stations, cinema distributors and media platforms in Germany and abroad. BROADVIEW TV has produced numerous documentaries for TV and cinema including the ARD-series 'German Dynasties', the arte-series 'TOO young TO DIE' and the ZDF-series 'Theatre Portraits' with Esther Schweins. Under the label Broadview Pictures, the company produced cinema documentaries that include Klitschko, Nowitzki. The Perfect Shot, Who owns nature?, KROOS and Resistance Fighters. Furthermore, Broadview TV also develops and shoots imagefilms for companies and institutions including the German Foreign Office and the European Union. The managing director is Leopold Hoesch. He represents The International Academy Of Television Arts & Industry as Ambassador to Germany.

Together with Guido Knopp and Sebastian Dehnhardt, Hoesch won the Emmy Award for Best Documentary for 'The Drama of Dresden' (2005).

Dokumentationen

Series 
Noble Dynasties in North Rhine-Westphalia
 German Dynasties
 Monarchies
 Theatre Makers
 Theatre Portraits
 Dynasties in North Rhine-Westphalia
 TOO Young TO DIE
 'UNSER LAND'

Awards and nominations won by Broadview TV 
2020 German Television Award for "Resistance Fighters" (Best Editing Info/Documentary)
2020 Nominated – German Television Award for "Resistance Fighters" (Best Documentary)
 2020 Award of Excellence Special Mention: Documentary Feature at the Impact DOCS Awards for "Resistance Fighters"
 2019 Impact Award at the Vancouver International Film Festival for "Resistance Fighters"
 2019 Grand Prix AST – Ville de Paris at the Pariscience Film Festival for "Resistance Fighters"
 2019 Nominated – German Television Award for "Coal"
 2018 Nominated – German Television Award for "3 Days in September" (Best Documentary)
 2017 Deutsche Akademie für Fernsehen: Award for Myrna Drews for "Hedda" (Set design)
 2017 Deutscher Wirtschaftsfilmpreis for "Germany's great clans - The C&A Story"
 2015 RIAS TV Award for "Breath of Freedom"
 2015 Nominated – Deutscher Filmpreis for "Nowitzki. The Perfect Shot"
 2015 Nominated – Magnolia Award (Shanghai) for "Nowitzki. The Perfect Shot"
 2014 Nominated – Magnolia Award (Shanghai), Prix Europe and Rockie Award (BANFF) for "Breath of Freedom"
 2013 Bavarian TV Award for "Citizen Springer"
 2013 Nominated – Sports Emmy Award for "KLITSCHKO"
 2012 Deutscher Wirtschaftsfilmpreis Award for "Citizen Springer"
 2012 Romy Award (Austria) for "KLITSCHKO" as 'Best Documentary Cinema' and for Leopold Hoesch as 'Best Producer'
 2011 Magnolia Award (Shanghai) for "The chancellor who fell to his knees. The two lives of Willy Brandt."
 2010 Banff World Media Festival Rockie Award for "The Miracle of Leipzig"
 2010 WorldFest-Houston Gold Remi Award for "The Miracle of Leipzig"
 2009 DocumFest (Timișoara, Romania) Great Prize Award for "The Miracle of Leipzig"
 2006 Nominated – World Television Award (Banff) for "The Drama of Dresden"
 2006 Magnolia Award (Shanghai) for "The Drama of Dresden"
 2005 Nominated – World Television Award (Banff) for "The Miracle of Bern – The True Story"
 2005 International Emmy Award (New York) for "The Drama of Dresden" (together with Sebastian Dehnhardt und Guido Knopp)
 2004 Nominated – Magnolia Award (Shanghai) for "Stalingrad"
 2004 German Television Award for "The Miracle of Bern – The True Story"
 2003 Nominated – International Emmy Award for "Stalingrad"

References

External links 
 
 Website of „Broadview TV“

Television production companies of Germany